Boris Aleksandrovich Kochkin (born 28 August 1982) is a former Russian footballer. He was an attacking midfielder.

Club career
He played in the Russian Football National League for FC SKA-Energiya Khabarovsk in 2007.

Boris previously played for Muktijoddha Sangsad KS in Bangladesh. After helping Pahang FA secure promotion to Malaysian Super League 2013, The Elephants have decided against renewing his contract for upcoming season.

References

External links
 
 
 Anak buah Dollah kenduri gol, belasah Singa Utara
 
 Boris mahu balas jasa

1982 births
Living people
Russian footballers
Association football forwards
FC Okean Nakhodka players
FC SKA-Khabarovsk players
FC Yenisey Krasnoyarsk players
FC Smena Komsomolsk-na-Amure players
Muktijoddha Sangsad KC players
Sri Pahang FC players
Russian expatriate footballers
Expatriate footballers in Bangladesh
Expatriate footballers in Malaysia